
Gmina Rychtal is a rural gmina (administrative district) in Kępno County, Greater Poland Voivodeship, in west-central Poland.

Villages
Gmina Rychtal contains the villages and settlements of Dalanów, Darnowiec, Drożki, Dworzyszcze, Krzyżowniki, Mały Buczek, Nowa Wieś, Proszów, Remiszówka, Skoroszów, Stogniewice, Szarlota, Wesoła, Wielki Buczek and Zgorzelec.

Neighbouring gminas
Gmina Rychtal is bordered by the gminas of Baranów, Bralin, Domaszowice, Namysłów, Perzów, Trzcinica and Wołczyn.

References
Polish official population figures 2006

Rychtal
Kępno County